Yadvendranagar railway station (YDV) is a passenger and express rail station. The station falls under the administration of Varanasi division,  North Eastern Railway zone.

This station has been named after Raja Jaunpur Yadvendra Dutt Dubey.

References

Railway stations in Jaunpur district
Railway stations opened in 1904
1904 establishments in India
Varanasi railway division